Natel Kenar may refer to:
 Natel Kenar-e Olya Rural District
 Natel Kenar-e Sofla Rural District